In mathematics, a quadratic set is a set of points in a projective space that bears the same essential incidence properties as a quadric (conic section in a projective plane, sphere or cone or hyperboloid in a projective space).

Definition of a quadratic set
Let  be a projective space.
(QS2) For any point  the union  of all tangent lines through  is a hyperplane or the entire space .

A quadratic set  is called non-degenerate if for every point , the set  is a hyperplane.

A Pappian projective space is a projective space in which Pappus's hexagon theorem holds.

The following result, due to Francis Buekenhout, is an astonishing statement for finite projective spaces.

 Theorem: Let be  a finite projective space of dimension  and  a non-degenerate quadratic set that contains lines.

Definition of an oval and an ovoid
Ovals and ovoids are special quadratic sets:
Let  be a projective space of dimension . A non-degenerate quadratic set  that does not contain lines is called ovoid (or oval in plane case).

The following equivalent definition of an oval/ovoid are more common:

Definition: (oval)
A non-empty point set  of a projective plane is called 
oval if the following properties are fulfilled:
(o1) Any line meets  in at most two points.
(o2) For any point  in  there is one and only one line  such that  .
A line   is a exterior or tangent or secant line of the 

For finite planes the following theorem provides a more simple definition.

Theorem: (oval in finite plane) Let be  a projective plane of order .
A set  of points is an oval if  and if no three points

According to this theorem of Beniamino Segre, for Pappian projective planes of odd order the ovals are just conics:
 
Theorem:
Let be  a Pappian projective plane of odd order.

Definition: (ovoid)
A non-empty point set  of a projective space is called ovoid if the following properties are fulfilled:
(O1) Any line meets  in at most two points.
( is called exterior, tangent and  secant line if  and  respectively.) 
(O2) For any point  the union  of all tangent lines through  is a hyperplane (tangent plane at ).

Example:
a) Any sphere (quadric of index 1) is an ovoid.
b) In case of real projective spaces one can construct ovoids by combining halves of suitable ellipsoids such that they are no quadrics.

For finite projective spaces of dimension  over a field  we have:
Theorem:

Counterexamples (Tits–Suzuki ovoid) show that i.g. statement b) of the theorem above is not true for :

References

 Albrecht Beutelspacher & Ute Rosenbaum (1998) Projective Geometry : from foundations to applications, Chapter 4: Quadratic Sets, pages 137 to 179, Cambridge University Press 
 F. Buekenhout (ed.) (1995) Handbook of Incidence Geometry, Elsevier 
 P. Dembowski (1968) Finite Geometries, Springer-Verlag , p. 48

External links
 Eric Hartmann Lecture Note Planar Circle Geometries, an Introduction to Moebius-, Laguerre- and Minkowski Planes, from Technische Universität Darmstadt

Geometry